Qarah Hajji-ye Sofla (also Romanized as Qarah Ḩājjī-ye Soflá; also known as Qarah Ḩājjīlū-ye Pā'īn and Qarah Ḩājjīlū-ye Soflá) is a village in Kandovan Rural District, Kandovan District, Meyaneh County, East Azerbaijan Province, Iran. At the 2006 census, its population was 45, in 8 families.

References 

Populated places in Meyaneh County